Jacques Julliard (born 4 March 1933) is a French historian, columnist and essayist, and a former union leader. He is the author of numerous books.

Life

Early years
Jacques Julliard was born on 4 March 1933 in Brénod, Ain.
His father and grandfather had both been mayors of the village where he was born.
He prepared (khâgne) for entrance to an École normale supérieure at the Lycée du Parc in Lyon, where he was influenced by two teachers close to Emmanuel Mounier.
He was admitted to the École normale supérieure in 1954 to study German, but changed over to History.
He passed his agrégation (teaching qualification) and after military service in Algeria became a secondary school teacher.

Union leader
Julliard was vice president of National Union of Students of France (UNEF: Union Nationale des Étudiants de France) from 1955 to 1956. 
From 1962 to 1970, and again from 1972 to 1977 he was a member of the national office of the General Union of National Education (SGEN: Syndicat général de l'Éducation nationale) of the French Confederation of Christian Workers (CFTC: Confédération française des travailleurs chrétiens).
From 1973 to 1976 he was a member of the confederate office of the French Democratic Confederation of Labour (CFDT: Confédération française démocratique du travail).

Teacher

While active in the unions, and later as a columnist, Julliard followed a career as an academic specialising in political and social issues.
He began a thesis on the trade unionist Fernand Pelloutier while contributing to the magazine Esprit.
He was appointed a professor of history at the  Bordeaux campus of Sciences Po in 1965.
He taught at the Centre de formation des journalistes.
With Jacques Ozouf he co-founded the History department at the University of Vincennes.
In 1978 he was elected director of studies at the School for Advanced Studies in the Social Sciences (École des hautes études en sciences sociales).

Columnist

Pierre Andreu was a friend of Jacques Julliard and Pierre Vidal-Naquet, with whom he directed the Cahiers Georges Sorel.

In 1970 Julliard was introduced to Jean Daniel by André Gorz.
Daniel offered him a position on the Nouvel Observateur, where he would remain until 2010.
He was Director of Collection at the éditions du Seuil.
In November 2010 Julliard left the Nouvel Observateur to become a columnist with the weekly Marianne, run by Maurice Szafran.

Publications

Publications by Jacques Julliard include:

Notes

Sources

1933 births
Living people
École Normale Supérieure alumni
20th-century French historians
Labor historians
20th-century French essayists
20th-century French journalists
21st-century French journalists
French columnists
French Democratic Confederation of Labour members
Academic staff of the School for Advanced Studies in the Social Sciences
Commandeurs of the Légion d'honneur
French male journalists
People from Ain